Enpinanga assamensis, the Assam hawkmoth, is a moth of the family Sphingidae. It is known from Sri Lanka, Nepal, north-eastern India, Bangladesh, the Andaman Islands, the Nicobar Islands, Thailand, southern China and northern Vietnam.

Description of adults
The wingspan is about 55 mm. Adults are strongly sexually dimorphic.

Male
The upperside of the head and thorax have a broad lateral stripe. The forewing upperside has a dark brown postmedian band and the forewing underside is mostly red. The hindwing upperside has an orange-buff median band.

Female
The ground colour of the forewing upperside is pale grey with a small black circular discal spot. The outer marginal area of the hindwing upperside is darker than the rest of the wing, while the inner margin is almost uniform in colour.

References

Macroglossini
Moths described in 1856